is a retired badminton player from Japan.

Career
Matsuno competed in badminton at the 1992 Summer Olympics in men's doubles with Shinji Matsuura. They lost in quarterfinals to Razif Sidek and Jalani Sidek, of Malaysia, 5–15, 4–15.

Achievements

World Cup 
Men's doubles

IBF World Grand Prix 
The World Badminton Grand Prix sanctioned by International Badminton Federation (IBF) from 1983 to 2006.

Men's doubles

References
sports-reference.com

Living people
Japanese male badminton players
Badminton players at the 1992 Summer Olympics
Olympic badminton players of Japan
Badminton players at the 1994 Asian Games
Badminton players at the 1990 Asian Games
Badminton players at the 1988 Summer Olympics
Asian Games competitors for Japan
1963 births
20th-century Japanese people